Kingmaker: The Change of Destiny is a 2020 South Korean television series starring Park Si-hoo, Ko Sung-hee, Sung Hyuk and Jun Kwang-ryul. It is based on the novel Wind, Clouds and Tombstone by Lee Byung-joo and airs on TV Chosun every Saturday and Sunday at 22:50 (KST) time slot starting May 17, 2020.

Synopsis
A story depicting a fierce struggle for the throne in Joseon.

Choi Chun-joong (Park Si-hoo) is the best face reader in the nation. He was born into a prestigious family, but his family was killed off. He is looked down upon as a fortune-teller, but he eventually becomes the most powerful person in Joseon. He is aware of Joseon's fate and tries to change it. He also devotes his life to the woman he loves.

Lee Bong-ryeon (Ko Sung-hee) is a beautiful princess and the daughter of King Cheoljong. She has a special ability to see the fate of people. Her ability is a blessing and, at the same time, a curse to her. Lee Bong-ryeon meets Choi Chun-joong and tries to change the fate of Joseon for the better.

Cast

Main
Park Si-hoo as Choi Chun-joong, Joseon's best fortune teller
Kang Tae-woo as young Choi Chun-joong
Ko Sung-hee as Princess Lee Bong-ryun, King Cheoljong's daughter
Hong Seung-hee as young Princess Lee Bong-ryun
Jun Kwang-ryul as Lee Ha-eung, Prince Heungsun, Gojong's father and an ambitious royal family
Sung Hyuk as Chae In-kyoo, adopted son of Jangdong Kim clan and Chun-joong's friend
Choi Jung-woo as young Chae In-kyu

Supporting

Jangdong Kim clan
Kim Seung-soo as Kim Byung-woon, Kim Jwa-geun's son which his power surprasess the King's.
Cha Kwang-soo as Kim Jwa-geun, Jangdong Kim clan's representative and head.
Yoon A-jung as Lady Na-hap, Kim Jwa-geun's concubine.
Han Jae-young as Kim Byung-hak, The core forces of Jangdong Kim clan.

Royal Household
Kim Bo-yeon as Dowager Queen Jo
The eldest member in the Royal family household and is the one who holds the key to the next succession to the throne after King Cheoljong's death.
Jung-Wook as King Cheoljong, the 25th King of Joseon and Lee Bong-ryun's father.
Eru as Lee Ha-jun, the most likely candidate for succession to the throne.
Park Sang-hoon as Lee Jae-hwang, Emperor Gojong, Lee Ha-eung's 2nd son and the first emperor of Joseon.
Park Jung-yeon as Min Ja-young, Empress Myeongseong
A woman with the fate to become a Queen Regnant (여왕). With Chun-joong's help, she deceives Prince Heungsun and then become Jae-hwang's primary wife and the first Empress Consort of Joseon.

People in Baeogae
Jo Bok-rae as Yong Pal-ryong, Chun-joong's right-hand man and Baeogae's informant.
Kim Joo-ryoung as Joo-Mo, Baeogae's mistress.
Han Dong-kyoo as the Equator's truth; the person who wearing a red coat and disguised as a wig and beard, she was called the Equator.
Noh Hyung-wook as Paeng Goo-chul, Joo-Mo's little brother.

Ratings

Notes

References

External links
  
 Kingmaker: The Change of Destiny at Victory Contents 
 
 

TV Chosun television dramas
Korean-language television shows
2020 South Korean television series debuts
2020 South Korean television series endings
South Korean historical television series
South Korean fantasy television series
South Korean romance television series
Television series set in the Joseon dynasty
Television series by Victory Contents